Rozhdestvenskoye is a rural locality (a village) in Ilyino-Polyansky Selsoviet, Blagoveshchensky District, Bashkortostan, Russia. The population was 104 as of 2010. There are 2 streets.

Geography 
Rozhdestvenskoye is located 23 km southeast of Blagoveshchensk (the district's administrative centre) by road. Ashkashla is the nearest rural locality.

References 

Rural localities in Blagoveshchensky District